Egy sima, egy fordított is the first album by Ibolya Oláh, the runner-up in the 2003-2004 edition of Megasztár.

The album has gone platinum in Hungary after sales of 20,000 (of a total population of 10 million).

Track listing
"Nem kell"
"Mi lesz velem"
"Csak egy perc"
"Embertelen dal"
"Most"
"A szerelemnek múlnia kell"
"Papa, ha félsz"
"Majd elfújja a szél"
"Találjmárrám"
"Ördögöd van"
"A lélek katonái"
"Jó estét nyár, jó estét szerelem"
"Hazám"

References

2004 debut albums
Albums produced by Péter Geszti